John David Molson (June 1, 1928 – May 8, 2017) was a Canadian businessman and sports executive. A member of the Molson family, he served as the president of the Montreal Canadiens for eight years.

Biography

Molson, known throughout his life as David, was born June 1, 1928 to John Henry Molson and Florence Hazel Browne. Educated in Montreal and then in Brussels (1948-1950), he joined Molson Breweries Limited in 1949. He worked for the company for several years and became a vice-president in January 1964.

Montreal Canadiens
During the 1963–64 NHL season, his cousin, Hartland Molson, who purchased the team in 1957, offered him the post of president of the Montreal Canadiens. Four years later, David and his brothers, Bill and Peter, acquired the team from their cousins. David continue as team president until 1972 when he and his brothers sold the team to Edward and Peter Bronfman for $15 million During his tenure, the Canadiens won 5 Stanley Cups: in 1965, 1966, 1968, 1969, and 1971.

Personal life
Molson married Claire Faulkner in 1955 with whom he has two sons (John Henry and David Hugh) and one daughter (Catherine Elizabeth).

Molson died on May 8, 2017 at the age of 88.

References

1928 births
2017 deaths
J, David Molson
Montreal Canadiens executives
National Hockey League executives
Stanley Cup champions